Vorobiov is a Russian surname 'Воробьёв', in Ukrainian 'Воробйов'. Notable people with the surname include:

 Evgeny Vorobiov (born 1976), Russian chess grandmaster
 Henadii Vorobiov
 Oleksandr Vorobiov (born 1984), Ukrainian gymnast

See also
 Vorobyov, written also Vorobiev or Vorobyev